is a river in Hokkaidō, Japan. It originates from Mount Shibetsu and flows through Nakashibetsu and Shibetsu into the Sea of Okhotsk.

References

Rivers of Hokkaido
Rivers of Japan